A swale is a shady spot, or a sunken or marshy place. In US usage in particular, it is a shallow channel with gently sloping sides.  Such a swale may be either natural or human-made. Artificial swales are often infiltration basins, designed to manage water runoff, filter pollutants, and increase rainwater infiltration. Bioswales are swales that involve the inclusion of plants or vegetation in their construction, specifically.

On land
This swale concept has also been popularized as a rainwater harvesting and soil conservation strategy by Bill Mollison, David Holmgren, and other advocates of permaculture. In this context it is usually a water-harvesting ditch on contour, also called a contour bund.

Swales as used in permaculture are designed to slow and capture runoff by spreading it horizontally across the landscape (along an elevation contour line), facilitating runoff infiltration into the soil.  This archetypal form of swale is a dug-out, sloped, often grassed or reeded "ditch" or "lull" in the landform. An option is to pile the spoil on to a new bank on the still lower slope. In which case a bund or berm is formed, mitigating the natural (and often hardscape-increased) risks to slopes below and any linked watercourse from flash flooding. 

In arid and seasonally dry places, vegetation (existing or planted) in the swale benefits heavily from the concentration of runoff. Trees and shrubs along the swale can provide shade and mulch which decrease evaporation.

On beaches
The term "swale" or "beach swale" is also used to describe long, narrow, usually shallow troughs between ridges or sandbars on a beach, that run parallel to the shoreline.

See also
 Contour trenching
 Gutter
 Keyline design
 Rain garden
 Stormwater
 Water-sensitive urban design

References

External links

 Fact Sheet: Dry and Wet Vegetated Swales from Federal Highway Administration
 Wetlands of the Great Lakes: The Beach Swale & Dune and Swale Types from Michigan State University
 Video showing swales used to rehabilitate desert terrain

Environmental engineering
Landforms
Landscape
Sustainable gardening
Sustainable design
Water
Water pollution

es:Zanja